Pichinglis, commonly referred to by its speakers as Pichi and formally known as Fernando Po Creole English (Fernandino), is an  Atlantic English-lexicon creole language spoken on the island of Bioko, Equatorial Guinea. It is an offshoot of the Krio language of Sierra Leone, and was brought to Bioko by Krios who immigrated to the island during the colonial era in the 19th century.

Pichi is the most widely spoken language of the capital Malabo, next to Spanish, and it serves as a primary language to probably the majority of the capital’s inhabitants. Pichi is also used as a primary language in a number of villages and towns along the Coast of Bioko – amongst them Sampaca, Fiston, Basupú, Barrio las Palmas and Luba (Morgades 2004), and is spoken as a lingua franca throughout Bioko. It is also spoken by a sizable community of people originating from Bioko in Bata, the largest town on the continental part of the country.

Size of speaker community 
Pichi is believed to have derived from the Krio language, which first arrived in Bioko, the former Fernando Po, with  African settlers from Freetown, Sierra Leone in 1827 (Fyfe 1962: 165). No official figures exist, but there is good reason to assume that Pichi is today the second most widely spoken African language of the country behind Fang, closely followed by Bubi. It is safe to assume that at least 100,000 people of the country’s population of around one million (2007 UN estimate) use Pichi regularly as a primary or secondary language.

Next to Fang, Pichi and Bubi, over ten other African languages are spoken by the peoples of Equatorial Guinea (Gordon 2005, cf. “Equatorial Guinea”).

One of these is another Creole, the Portuguese-lexicon Creole Fá d'Ambô, spoken by the people of the island of Annobón (cf. Map 1). Fa d’Ambô shares historical and linguistic ties with the other Portuguese-lexicon Creoles of the Gulf of Guinea (cf. e.g. Post 1994), namely Lungwa Santome and Angolar in São Tomé Island and Lun'gwiye in Principe Island (but also cf. Granda 1985 on the influence of Pichi on Fa d’Ambô).

The other languages traditionally spoken in Equatorial Guinea belong to the Bantu branch of the Niger–Congo family. In the literature, Pichi is known under the names Fernando Po Creole English (e.g. Gordon 2005), Fernando Po Krio (e.g. Berry 1970, Holm  1989), Fernandino Creole English (e.g. Holm 1989), Pidgin (English) (Morgades 2004), Broken English (e.g. de Zarco 1938) and Pichinglis (e.g. Lipski 1992). While many older speakers refer to the language as Krio or Pidgin, most present-day speakers refer to it as Pichinglis, Pichin with a nasalised final vowel or Pichi tout court.

Present status 
The lexical similarity between Pichi and English and the supposed simplification of English structures that European observers believed they recognized in a language they did not master, lent additional weight to racist notions about a generally assumed superiority of European languages and their speakers. As a consequence, Pichi was considered an impoverished, debased form of English by Spanish colonial administrators and missionaries (cf. Zarco 1938: 5-7 for a pungent exposition of this view). Pichi, like the other Creole languages of the Atlantic Basin, still has to struggle with this difficult legacy. In spite of its great importance as a community language, and as a national and international lingua franca, Pichi enjoys no official recognition nor support, is conspicuously absent from public discourse and the official media, and has no place in the educational policy of Equatorial Guinea.

Linguistic affiliation 
Pichi is a member of the African branch of the family of Atlantic English-lexicon Creoles. It descends directly from Krio, the English-lexicon Creole that rose to become the language of the Creole community of Freetown, Sierra Leone in the late 18th century (cf. Huber 1999). Throughout the better part of the 19th century, this community, which had emerged from the horrors of slavery and the slave trade, began to forge a vibrant African-European culture and economy along the West African seaboard (cf. e.g. Fyle 1962; Wyse 1989). Mutual intelligibility within the African branch is quite high. However, an impediment to fluid communication between speakers of Pichi and its sister languages is the divergent path of development of Pichi since 1857. In that year, Spain began to actively enforce colonial rule in Equatorial Guinea. From then onwards, Pichi was cut off from the direct influence of English, the language from which it inherited the largest part of its lexicon. Some of the present-day differences between Pichi and its sister languages can be attributed to internal developments in Pichi. But without doubt, an equally important reason for the separate development of Pichi is the extensive degree of language contact with Equatoguinean Spanish, the colonial and present-day official language of Equatorial Guinea.

Language contact between Pichi and Spanish 
Spanish has left a deep imprint on the lexicon and grammar of Pichi. Code-mixing is an integral part of the linguistic system of Pichi. The pervasive influence of Spanish on Pichi is for one part, the consequence of language policy. Since colonial rule, Spanish has remained the sole medium of instruction at all levels of the educational system (cf. e.g. Lipski 1991: 35-36). There is a widespread competence in different registers of Spanish by Pichi speakers in Malabo (cf. Lipski 1985, 1992). In Malabo, the acquisition of Spanish begins in early childhood, even for many working-class Equatoguineans with little or no school education. Equally, the burgeoning oil economy of Equatorial Guinea has led to increased urbanisation, extending multi-ethnic social networks and the spread of Pichi as a native language. In such a socio-economic environment and amidst a high general competence in the official language Spanish, code-mixing between Pichi and Spanish, rather than being exceptional, is consciously and confidently articulated in daily life.

Some examples of Pichi–Spanish code-mixing 
Spanish words are in bold in the following Pichi sentences (examples from Yakpo 2009)

Overview of Pichi grammar 
Pichi has a seven vowel system featuring the phonemes . The consonant phonemes of Pichi are twenty-two: .
The language features a mixed prosodic system which employs both pitch accent and tone. Pichi has two distinctive tones, a high (H) and a low (L) tone. In pitch-accented words, a phonetic (L) tone is the default realisation of a toneless syllable (X). Examples follow with the four possible tonal configurations for bisyllabic words (examples from Yakpo 2009):

The morphological structure of Pichi is largely isolating. However, there is a limited use of inflectional and derivational morphology in which affixation, tone and suppletive forms are put to use. For example, the categories of tense, modality and aspect are expressed through phonologically distinct preverbal particles. The verb stem is not altered:

Besides that, there is a limited use of inflectional morphology in the pronominal system, in which both tone and suppletive forms are used to express case relations. For example, the dependent subject pronoun à ‘1SG.SBJ’ has the allomorphs mì ‘1SG.POSS’ and mi ‘3SG.EMP’. In the following example, tone alone distinguishes possessive from objective case of the 1SG personal pronoun: 

Pichi is an aspect-prominent language in which aspect (and mood), rather than tense plays a dominant role in expressing temporal relations. Besides that, the modal system includes an indicative-subjunctive opposition. Subjunctive mood is instantiated in the modal complementiser  ‘SBJV’ and occurs in contexts characterised by the presence of deontic modality, i.e. in directive main clauses such as imperatives as well as in the subordinate clauses of deontic modality inducing main predicates (see the first example below). Subjunctive mood also occurs in purpose clauses (see the second example below):

The language exhibits a subject–verb word order in intransitive clauses and a subject–verb–object order in transitive clauses. Content questions are formed by way of a mixed question-word system which involves transparent (e.g. us=tin 'which=thing' = 'what') and opaque question elements (udat 'who').

Clause linkage is characterised by a large variety of strategies and forms, in which the subordinator we, the quotative marker se, and the two modal complementisers fɔ̀ and mek stand out as multifunctional elements with overlapping functions. The language also features various types of multiverb and serial verb constructions. Amongst the latter figure instrumental serial verb constructions involving the verb tek 'take' as well as comparative constructions featuring the verb pas '(sur)pass'.

See also 
Bioko
Equatorial Guinea
Fernandino peoples

References

Relevant literature

External links 
 Historia de Guinea
About pidgins
Spanish world-wide: the last century of language contacts by John M. Lipski
 This gallery includes a scanned page of a Pichinglis dictionary/grammar book, Dialecto inglés africano de la colonia española del Golfo de Guinea, R.P. Mariano de Zarco, C.M.F., 1938, H. Proost y Cía, Turhhout, Belgium.

Languages of Equatorial Guinea
History of Equatorial Guinea
History of Nigeria
English-based pidgins and creoles of Africa
Spanish language in Africa